Group D of the 2015 FIFA Women's World Cup consisted of the United States, Australia, Sweden and Nigeria. Matches were played from 8 to 16 June 2015.

Teams

Standings

In the round of 16:
United States advanced to play Colombia (third-placed team of Group F).
Australia advanced to play Brazil (winner of Group E).
Sweden (as one of the four best third-placed teams) advanced to play Germany (winner of Group B).

Matches

Sweden vs Nigeria

United States vs Australia

Australia vs Nigeria

United States vs Sweden

Nigeria vs United States

Australia vs Sweden

References

External links
Official website

Group D
2014–15 in Nigerian football
Group
Group
Group